Ulrik Balling (born 11 June 1975) is a retired Danish professional football player who is currently the assistant manager of Næstved BK.

External links
 Vejle Boldklub profile 
 Danish national team profile 
 Career statistics at Danmarks Radio 

1975 births
Danish expatriate men's footballers
Danish football managers
Danish men's footballers
Danish Superliga players
Denmark under-21 international footballers
Expatriate footballers in Norway
Danish expatriate sportspeople in Norway
Living people
Næstved Boldklub players
Eliteserien players
Tromsø IL players
Vejle Boldklub players
Association football forwards